Algemene Middelbare School or AMS (Dutch, "General Secondary School") was during part of the twentieth century a level of education in the Netherlands (but also the Dutch East Indies and Suriname), comparable with the  high school level in the US education system. Its successors were the mavo and vbo, now both replaced by vmbo.

See also
 Education in the Netherlands

References

Education in Indonesia
Schools in the Dutch East Indies